The 1999 Men's African Volleyball Championship was in Cairo, Egypt, with 6 teams participating in the continental championship.

Teams

Results

Final

Final ranking

References
 Men Volleyball Africa Championship 1999 Cairo (EGY)

1999 Men
African championship, Men
Men's African Volleyball Championship
1999 in Egyptian sport
International volleyball competitions hosted by Egypt